Peter Dahl may refer to:
 Peter Dahl (artist)
 Peter Dahl (footballer)
 Peter Dahl (rugby union)